The 1964–65 Kansas Jayhawks men's basketball team represented the University of Kansas during the 1964–65 college men's basketball season.

Roster
Walt Wesley
Al Lopes
Del Lewis
Riney Lochmann
Ron Franz
Fred Chana
Dave Schichtle
Jim Gough
Kerry Bolton
Dave Brill
Larry Norris
Pat Davis

Schedule

References

Kansas Jayhawks men's basketball seasons
Kansas
Kansas
Kansas